Magic in the Moonlight is a 2014 romantic comedy film written and directed by Woody Allen. It is Allen's 44th film. The film stars Emma Stone, Colin Firth, Hamish Linklater, Marcia Gay Harden, Jacki Weaver, Eileen Atkins, and Simon McBurney. Set in the 1920s on the French Riviera, the film was released on July 25, 2014, by Sony Pictures Classics. Magic in the Moonlight received a mixed reception. Critics praised the performances of Firth and Stone, but found its writing formulaic.

Plot

In 1928, an illusionist, Wei Ling Soo, performs in front of a crowd in Berlin with his world-class magic act. Soo is actually a British man named Stanley, who wears a disguise in his act. In his dressing room, he is greeted by old friend and fellow illusionist Howard Burkan. Howard enlists Stanley to go with him to the Côte d'Azur, where a rich American family, the Catledges, has apparently been taken in by a clairvoyant, Sophie; the son of the family, Brice, is smitten with her. Howard said he has been unable to uncover the secrets behind Sophie's tricks, and is tempted to believe she really has supernatural powers. He asks Stanley, who has debunked many charlatan mystics, to help him prove she is a fraud.

Howard and Stanley travel to the French Riviera, but Stanley is soon astonished by Sophie's ability to go into a fugue state and apparently pull out highly personal details about him and his family. Stanley witnesses a seance in which Sophie communicates with the deceased patriarch of the American family. A candle floats up from the table and Howard grabs it to try to discern what trickery is at play, but is astounded to find no apparent subterfuge.

When Stanley and Sophie visit his Aunt Vanessa, Sophie is seemingly able, after holding Aunt Vanessa's pearls, to somehow relate secret details of Vanessa's great love affair. This finally convinces Stanley of Sophie's authenticity. He has an epiphany, realizing that his lifelong rationalism and cynicism have been misguided. When caught in a rain storm, Stanley and Sophie end up at an observatory the former had visited as a child. After the rain subsides, they open the roof up and view the stars.

At a Gatsby-esque party, Stanley and Sophie dance. As they walk together later that night, Sophie asks him if he has felt any feelings for her "as a woman". Stanley is taken aback and admits he has not thought of her in that way. She leaves upset. The next day Stanley holds a press conference to tell the world that he, who spent his life debunking charlatan mystics, has finally come to find one who is the real deal. The conference is interrupted when he receives news that Aunt Vanessa has been in a car accident.

Stanley rushes to the hospital, and considers turning to prayer for solace; he begins to pray for a miracle to save his aunt, but is unable to go through with it as the rationality that has been his whole life comes back. He rejects prayer, the supernatural and by extension, Sophie and her powers. He decides once more to prove she is a fraud.

Using a trick seen earlier in his stage act, Stanley appears to leave the room but stays to overhear Sophie and Howard discuss their collusion in what has been an elaborate ruse. He discovers Sophie was able to know so much about him and his aunt because she and Howard collaborated to fool Stanley. Sophie is indeed a charlatan, and Howard had found out. Rather than unmask her to stop the ruse, he enlisted Sophie to help him one-up Stanley.

Stanley is initially angry at Howard and Sophie, but decides to forgive them. In a conversation with Aunt Vanessa, who has recovered from her car accident, Stanley admits that he is in love with Sophie. He finds her and asks her to marry him instead of Brice. Sophie is taken aback and rejects his haughty, awkward proposal. Returning dejected to Aunt Vanessa's, Stanley admits that he fell in love with Sophie at first sight. He is then surprised when Sophie, who had arrived before him, knocks a spirit knock. He proposes, she accepts with a spirit knock, and they kiss.

Cast

Production
In April 2013, Colin Firth and Emma Stone joined the cast of the film. In July, they were joined by Jacki Weaver, Marcia Gay Harden, and Hamish Linklater, and Allen began shooting in Nice, France. Allen revealed the film's title to be Magic in the Moonlight on October 15, 2013.

Music
Soundtrack
 "You Do Something to Me" by Cole Porter, performed by Leo Reisman and His Orchestra
 "It's All a Swindle" ("Alles Schwindel") by Mischa Spoliansky and Marcellus Schiffer, performed by Ute Lemper
 "Moritat" from The Threepenny Opera by Kurt Weill and Bertolt Brecht, performed by Conal Fowkes
 "Dancing With Tears in My Eyes" by Joseph A. Burke and Al Dubin, performed by Nat Shilkret and His Orchestra
 "Big Boy" by Milton Ager and Jack Yellen, performed by Bix Beiderbecke
 "Thou Swell" from A Connecticut Yankee by Richard Rodgers and Lorenz Hart, performed by Bix Beiderbecke
 "Sorry" by Raymond Klages, performed by Bix Beiderbecke & His Gang
 "The Sheik of Araby" by Harry B. Smith, Francis Wheeler and Ted Snyder, performed by Sidney De Paris and De Paris Brothers Orchestra
 "Chinatown, My Chinatown" by William Jerome and Jean Schwartz, performed by the Firehouse Five Plus Two
 "Remember Me" by Sonny Miller, performed by Al Bowlly
 "Charleston" by James P. Johnson and R. C. McPherson, performed by Paul Whiteman & His Orchestra
 "Sweet Georgia Brown" by Ben Bernie, Maceo Pinkard and Kenneth Casey, performed by The California Ramblers
 "You Call It Madness (But I Call It Love)" by Con Conrad, Gladys DuBois, Russ Colombo and Paul Gregory, performed by Smith Ballew and His Piping Rock Orchestra
 "At the Jazz Band Ball" by Larry Shields, Anthony S. Barbaro, D. James LaRocca and Edwin B. Edwards, performed by Bix Beiderbecke & His Gang
 "It All Depends on You" by Ray Henderson, Lew Brown and B. G. DeSylva, performed by Ruth Etting
 "I'll Get By (As Long as I Have You)" by Fred E. Ahlert and Roy Turk, performed by Conal Fowkes

Used in the film but not on the soundtrack are:
 "The Adoration of the Earth" from The Rite of Spring by Igor Stravinsky, performed by the London Festival Orchestra
 Boléro by Maurice Ravel, performed by the Royal Philharmonic Orchestra
 Molto vivace, second movement from Symphony No. 9 in D minor by Ludwig van Beethoven, performed by the Royal Philharmonic Orchestra
 "Thou Swell" from A Connecticut Yankee by Richard Rodgers and Lorenz Hart, performed by Cynthia Sayer and Hamish Linklater
 "I'm Always Chasing Rainbows" by Harry Carroll and Joseph McCarthy, performed by Cynthia Sayer and Hamish Linklater
 "Who?" from Sunny by Oscar Hammerstein II, Otto Harbach and Jerome Kern, performed by David O'Neal and Hamish Linklater

Release
The film was set to be released on July 25, 2014. On October 17, 2013, it was announced that FilmNation Entertainment would handle the international sales for the film and Sony Pictures Classics had acquired North American distribution rights to it. On July 25, 2014, the film opened in seventeen US theaters. and expanded nationwide in the US on August 15, 2014.

Reception

Critical reception
Magic in the Moonlight received mixed reviews from critics. On Rotten Tomatoes, the film has an approval rating of 51%, based on 189 reviews, with an average rating of 5.9/10. The site's consensus states: "While far from a failure, Magic in the Moonlight is too slight to stand with Woody Allen's finest work." Review aggregator Metacritic assigns the film a score of 54 out of 100, based on 40 critics, indicating "mixed or average reviews".

Rex Reed, writing for The New York Observer, gave the film a largely positive review, calling it "a masterstroke of enchantment" and praising Colin Firth's performance. Jordan Hoffman, writing for MTV.com, also enjoyed the film, stating, "This picture isn’t as showy or obvious as one of his (many) masterpieces, but it is quite good and deserves your time and respect." In The New Yorker, David Denby agreed that Colin Firth "carries [the film] through." In The Wall Street Journal, Joe Morgenstern complimented Emma Stone and concluded, "Think of it as a 97-minute séance that draws you in, spins you around, subverts your suppositions, levitates your spirits and leaves you giddy with delight".

However, in Vanity Fair, Richard Lawson criticized Emma Stone's acting, arguing, "her line delivery is too modern to really work convincingly in the period, and like many other nonetheless talented actors, she has trouble with Allen’s stilted, formal cadence." He added that the age gap between Stone and Firth (28 years) was "a little gross" and "icky". Alan Scherstuhl of the Village Voice disliked the film, criticizing its familiarity from Allen's previous work and believing the writing was uninspired. Chris Nashawaty of Entertainment Weekly gave the movie a "B−" grade (from A+ to F), remarking that it was funny and "pleasant", but also forgettable. Salons Andrew O'Hehir felt that the characters were not drawn out enough because of poor writing. The New York Times' A. O. Scott wrote: "Mr. Allen has had his ups and downs over the years. Rarely, though, has he put a story on screen that manifests so little energy, so little curiosity about its own ideas and situations."

In 2016 film critics Robbie Collin and Tim Robey ranked it as one of the worst movies by Woody Allen.

Box office
The film opened in limited release in North America on July 25, 2014. In 17 theaters, it grossed $412,095 ($24,241 per screen) in its opening weekend. It expanded to 964 theaters on August 15, grossing $1,786,150 ($1,853 per screen) in three days. By the end of its North American run, it grossed $10,539,326.

Internationally the film earned $40.5 million, for a worldwide gross of $51 million.

References

External links
 
 
 
 
 

2014 films
2014 romantic comedy films
American romantic comedy films
English-language French films
French romantic comedy films
Films directed by Woody Allen
Films with screenplays by Woody Allen
Films about con artists
Films about magic and magicians
Films set in 1928
Films set in Berlin
Films set in London
Films set on the French Riviera
Films shot in France
Sony Pictures Classics films
Films produced by Letty Aronson
Films produced by Stephen Tenenbaum
2010s English-language films
2010s American films
2010s French films